Nagpur Province was a province of British India that covered parts of the present-day states of Madhya Pradesh, Maharashtra, and Chhattisgarh. The city of Nagpur was the capital of the province.

In 1861, Nagpur Province was merged into the Central Provinces together with the Saugor and Nerbudda Territories.

History
Nagpur Province was formed after the death of the heirless Maharaja Raghoji III in 1853. The British used the doctrine of lapse to justify the annexation of the princely state of Nagpur. The province included the domains of the Maratha Bhonsle Maharajas of Nagpur, powerful members of the Maratha Confederacy who conquered large tracts of central and eastern India in the 18th century. In 1818, at the conclusion of the Third Anglo-Maratha War, the Bhonsle Maharaja submitted to a subsidiary alliance, and Nagpur became a princely state under the suzerainty of the British crown. It was thereafter administered by a commissioner under the Governor-General of India. 

In 1861, Nagpur Province was merged with the Saugor and Nerbudda Territories to constitute the new Central Provinces and Berar administrative division. 
The districts of Nagpur, Bhandara, Chada, Wardha, and Balaghat became the Nagpur Division of the new province, while Durg, Raipur, and Bilaspur became the Chhattisgarh Division. Chhindwara District was added to Nerbudda Division.

Districts
 Chhindwara
 Nagpur
 Bhandara
 Chanda
 Wardha
 Balaghat
 Durg
 Raipur
 Bilaspur

Provincial Commissioners 
----- Mansel (took office on 13 March 1854, before resident at Nagpur), 1854
Captain Elliot, 1854 - 1855
 G. Plowden, 1855 - 1860
 (vacant) 1860 - 1861

References

Provinces of British India
History of Nagpur
States and territories established in 1853
States and territories disestablished in 1861
1861 disestablishments in Asia
History of Maharashtra
History of Chhattisgarh
1853 establishments in India